The U.S. Virgin Islands national soccer team, nicknamed The Dashing Eagle, is the national soccer team of the U.S. Virgin Islands and is controlled by the U.S. Virgin Islands Soccer Federation.

History
Though FIFA did not officially recognize the USVI team as affiliated until 1992, the Virgin Islands federation was founded in the 1970s by Trinidad native Robert T. Wills who helped build the base of the USVI Soccer Federation as it is known today. The team played its first official international match on March 21, 1998, in a victory against the British Virgin Islands. In May 2011, the USVI soccer federation chief, Frederick Hillaren, began ambitious changes in the team and appointed Keith Griffith, former coach and captain of the Barbados national team and former coach of Trinidad and Tobago powerhouse club team Joe Public F.C., as technical director. Within two months of Griffith's appointment, the team shot up 51 places in the FIFA World Rankings. Soccer is the third most popular sport on the islands.

Stadium 
Previously the team did not have a national stadium and were forced to play their home matches at Lionel Roberts Park, a baseball stadium in Charlotte Amalie. For their 2014 World Cup qualification matches, the team needed to bring in a new grass surface and make other special arrangements. In the past, the team has played at Paul E. Joseph Stadium in St. Croix. However, in February 2012, it was announced that the stadium was condemned and will be demolished to make way for a new sports complex that will cost at least $50 million. The  complex will contain venues for tennis, volleyball, baseball, and aquatics. However, the plans did not include a new soccer stadium.

For the 2018 World Cup qualification, the team played at the Addelita Cancryn Junior High School Ground where they suffered a 4–0 loss to the Barbados national team.

In August 2019, the USVI Soccer Association officially opened the 1,200-seat Bethlehem Soccer Stadium in Christiansted after an almost four-year construction process of the new complex.

Results and fixtures

The following is a list of match results in the last 12 months, as well as any future matches that have been scheduled.

2022

2023

Squad

Current squad
The following players have been named to the squad for 2022-23 CONCACAF Nations League matches against Sint Maarten, Turks and Caicos Islands, and Bonaire.
Caps and goals updated on June 14, 2022, following the matches against Bonaire.

Recent call-ups
The following players have also been called up to the United States Virgin Islands squad within the last twelve months.

INJ Withdrew due to injury
PRE Preliminary squad / standby
RET Retired from the national team
SUS Serving suspension
WD Player withdrew from the squad due to non-injury issue.

Records 

Players in bold text are still active with US Virgin Islands.

Most appearances

Top goalscorers

Coaching history 

  Paul Inurie (2000)
  Glad Bugariu (2000–2002)
  Francisco Williams Ramírez (2003–2004)
  Carlton Freeman (2004–2008)
  Craig Martin (2010)
 Keith Griffith (2011)
  Terrence Jones (2011)
  Leonard Appleton (2014)
  Ahmed Mohamed Ahmed (2015–2017)
  Craig Martin (2017)
 Marcelo Serrano (2017–2019)
 Gilberto Damiano (2019–2022)

Technical directors 

  Keith Griffith (2011–2013)
  Kenadall Walkes (2013–)

Competitive record

World Cup record

Gold Cup record

CONCACAF Nations League record

Caribbean Cup record

Head-to-head record

References

External links 
 

 
Caribbean national association football teams